Robert S Gourlay is a former Hong Kong international lawn bowler.

He won a silver medal in the fours at the 1954 British Empire and Commonwealth Games in Vancouver, with Alfred Coates and brothers Raoul da Luz and Jose da Luz.

He also competed in the 1958 British Empire and Commonwealth Games in Cardiff, Wales.

References

Possibly living people
Year of birth missing

Hong Kong male bowls players
Commonwealth Games silver medallists for Hong Kong
Commonwealth Games medallists in lawn bowls
Bowls players at the 1954 British Empire and Commonwealth Games
Medallists at the 1954 British Empire and Commonwealth Games